Gregory Arthur Lamb (born 4 March 1981) is a Zimbabwean cricketer. He is a right-handed batsman who can bowl both off spin and right arm medium pace.

He was Zimbabwe's Young Player of the Year and represented his country at Under-12, Under-15 and Under-19 levels. He played in the C&G Trophy final for Hampshire against Warwickshire in 2005 and was a valuable member of the squad which finished runners-up in the Frizzell County Championship in 2005.

Lamb was released by Hampshire at the end of the 2008 season having not played for the first team under caretaker coach Giles White. He took just eight Championship wickets at 71.37 in the 2008 County Championship season.

In 2009 Lamb joined Wiltshire, making his debut in the Minor Counties Championship against Wales Minor Counties.

Lamb has since returned to Zimbabwe to play for the Mashonaland Eagles. Lamb has had a prolific season with the Eagles which has led to his inclusion in Zimbabwe's squad for their tour to the West Indies.

International career
Lamb made his debut for Zimbabwe in Twenty20 Internationals against the West Indies, scoring 11 runs and taking 2/14 from 4 overs, including the wicket of Shivnarine Chanderpaul leg before as Zimbabwe won by 26 runs.

Lamb made his One Day International debut for Zimbabwe against the West Indies on 4 March 2010, where in the West Indies innings he took the wicket of Shivnarine Chanderpaul LBW as Zimbabwe went on to win the match by 2 runs.

External links
 

1981 births
Living people
Cricketers from Harare
Zimbabwean cricketers
CFX Academy cricketers
Mashonaland cricketers
Hampshire cricketers
Wiltshire cricketers
Mashonaland Eagles cricketers
Zimbabwe One Day International cricketers
Zimbabwe Twenty20 International cricketers
Cricketers at the 2011 Cricket World Cup
Zimbabwe Test cricketers
Alumni of Lomagundi College
White Zimbabwean sportspeople